Isaac Emmanuel Angking (born January 24, 2000) is a Puerto Rican professional footballer who plays as a defensive midfielder for MLS Next Pro club Columbus Crew 2 and the Puerto Rico national team.

Early career
Angking was born in Providence, Rhode Island, and began his career playing for a local team, Bayside FC Bolts. At the age of 14, he joined the youth sides of MLS side New England Revolution. With their U-19 side, he scored 12 goals in 11 games.

Club career

New England Revolution
On January 2, 2018, Angking was called up to the New England Revolution Senior Squad—their fourth homegrown player. However, he failed to make an appearance for most of 2018, in part due to an injury he suffered in preseason, setting him aside for majority of the 2018 season. On September 5, 2018, Angking made his first MLS appearance against NYCFC, coming on for Brian Wright. Angking was loaned to the team's USL League One side, New England Revolution II after the conclusion of the MLS is Back Tournament. He scored his first professional goal with the team on August 17, 2020 when he scored two goals against North Texas SC, in a 3–3 draw. On December 8, 2020, Angking was released by New England.

Columbus Crew 2
On February 18, 2022, Angking joined Columbus Crew 2, the reserve side of Major League Soccer's Columbus Crew, ahead of their inaugural MLS Next Pro season.

International career
Angking was born in Providence, Rhode Island to a stateside Puerto Rican father and a mother from Sarawak, Malaysia, which makes him eligible to represent either the US, Puerto Rico or Malaysia at the senior level.

United States
Angking has been capped for various US youth sides, namely the U-17 side in the Nike International Friendlies, where he played in all three games in victories over Brazil, Portugal, and Turkey. However, he missed the U-17 World Cup.

Puerto Rico
In mid December 2020, Angking was called-up by Puerto Rico at senior level for a training camp in the Dominican Republic from January 10 to 20, 2021. He made his international debut on January 19, 2021, as a 68th minute substitution in a 1–0 away friendly win against the Dominican Republic and was booked in the 82nd minute. Angking scored his first goal for Puerto Rico on June 2 against the Bahamas, netting the third goal of an eventual 7–0 victory.

International goals
Scores and results list Puerto Rico's goal tally first.

International career statistics

References

External links
 National Football Teams profile
 Profile at New England Revolution site
 Profile at USSDA

2000 births
Living people
Puerto Rican footballers
Association football midfielders
Puerto Rico international footballers
Puerto Rican people of Malaysian descent
Sportspeople from Providence, Rhode Island
New England Revolution players
United States men's youth international soccer players
Soccer players from Rhode Island
American soccer players
United States men's under-20 international soccer players
Major League Soccer players
Hartford Athletic players
Charlotte Independence players
American sportspeople of Puerto Rican descent
American people of Malaysian descent
Homegrown Players (MLS)
New England Revolution II players
USL League One players
Columbus Crew 2 players
MLS Next Pro players